The American Society of Muslims was a predominantly African-American association of Muslims which was the direct descendant of the original Nation of Islam. It was created by Warith Deen Mohammed after he assumed leadership of the Nation of Islam upon the death of his father Elijah Muhammad. Imam W. Deen Mohammed changed the name of the Nation of Islam to the "World Community of Islam in the West" in 1976, then the "American Muslim Mission" in 1981, and finally the "American Society of Muslims".

The group largely accepted beliefs and practices based on mainstream Sunni Islam, abandoning many of the distinctive claims of the founders of the Nation of Islam. W. D. Mohammed retired as the leader of the association in 2003 and established a charity called The Mosque Cares.

History
After the 1975 death of Elijah Muhammad, his son Warith Deen Mohammed took over leadership of the Nation of Islam. He quickly rejected many of his father's views, including black separatism and belief in the divinity of Wallace Fard Muhammad, founder of the Nation of Islam. He was "determined to bring it into conformity with mainstream Islam". In 1976 he changed the name of the organization to World Community of Islam in the West. In 1981 it changed again to American Muslim Mission, a name that was retained until 1985. Finally it settled on the American Society of Muslims.

In 1977, Louis Farrakhan resigned from Warith Deen's reformed organization, and with a number of supporters decided to rebuild the original Nation of Islam upon the foundation established by Wallace Fard Muhammad and Elijah Muhammad.  Over time Minister Farrakhan regained many of the Nation of Islam's original National properties including the flagship National Headquarters Mosque #2 (Mosque Maryam) in Chicago, IL.

Organizational reforms

Second renaming
On September 10, 1978, in an address in Atlanta, Georgia, Warith Deen Mohammed resigned from his position as Chief Imam of the World Community of Al-Islam in the West and appointed a Consultative Body of Imams (A'immah) to oversee the activities of the Community. Upon his resignation W. D. Mohammed pledged to serve as an ambassador at large for the community. This was his first step in separating his ministry from the narrow confines of the Nation of Islam/World Community of Islam. The original Council of Imams, according to Imam Muhammad, would consist of the 6 Imams over the Regions and it would have an accountant as a financial adviser, an attorney as a legal adviser and one of the headmasters over the schools to advise on education matters. The council would have at least two Imams affiliated with his leadership who were from outside of America who were over Islamic Studies departments. Also, extra support and protection for the council would come from every Imam in good standing. Each would have the power to criticize.

The original Council of Imams consisted of: 
 Sheik James Abdul-Aziz Shabazz of Chicago, Illinois
 Imam Ali Rasheed of Masjid Malcolm Shabazz, New York, NY
 Imam Khalil Abdel Alim of Washington, DC
 Imam Ibrahim Pasha of Atlanta, GA
 Imam Ibrahim Kamal ud-Din of Houston, TX
 Imam Abdul Karim Hasan of Los Angeles, CA.

The Auxiliary members were: 
 Imam Muhammad Abdullah of Oakland, CA, by way of Pakistan
 Imam B. Mustafa Ali of Milwaukee, Wisconsin
 Sheik Tajuddin B. Shuaib of Los Angeles, CA, by way of Africa
 Imam Shakir Mahmood of Boston, MA
 Sheik Ahmed Rufai of New York, NY, by way of Nigeria
 Imam Nuridden Faiz of Hartford, Connecticut
 Dr. R. Muhammad Mazen Al-Wan of Detroit, Michigan, by way of Iran
 Imam Alfred Muhammad of Baltimore, MD
 Imam Clyde Rahman of Masjid Bilal, Cleveland, Ohio
 Sheik Muhammad Nur of Chicago, Illinois, by way of Sudan
 Imam Nasir Ahmed of Miami, Florida.

Third renaming
The change from the American Muslim Mission to the American Society of Muslims occurred in the context of problems following protracted legal challenges caused by financial claims on the estate of Elijah Muhammad made on behalf of children he had fathered out of wedlock. In 1985 Warith Deen Mohammed ordered the dissolution of the American Muslim Mission. W. D. Mohammed said disbanding the American Muslim Mission means "we are members of the worldwide Muslim community...not to be identified in geographic terms or political terms or racial terms". The decision to break up the organization meant that each mosque would be autonomous.  Despite dissolving the movement legally, it continued informally, but this did not stop a legal judgement in 1987 which forced the sale of $10 million worth of property. W. D. Mohammed sold a number of properties to Farrakhan, including Temple No. 2, the headquarters mosque, which was purchased with a donation to Farrakhan from Muammar Gaddafi. W. D. Mohammed reconstituted the movement as the American Society of Muslims in 1988. Warith Deen Mohammed and Farrakhan retained control of their rival groups before a phase of rapprochement in the 1990s.

In the July 9, 1999, issue of The Wall Street Journal an article cited the growing membership of the American Society of Muslims. In 2002 its numbers were estimated at "near 2.5 million persons with a percentage of immigrant and naturalized American citizens from various Muslim ethnic peoples, European Americans, and a majority of African Americans representing five generations since the earliest history of Elijah Mohammed's leadership (1933) and in some cases before."

Warith Deen resigned from the leadership of the American Society of Muslims on August 31, 2003, and established The Mosque Cares. He gave as his reason for resigning that the imams within the organization continued to resist his reforms.

On December 21, 2003, Imam Mustafa El-Amin was given W. D. Mohammed's blessing to attempt to maintain the ASM as an organization. El-Amin advertised in The Muslim Journal, expressing solidarity with the aims of the former leader. El-Amin received little support and the ASM did not reorganize. After W.D. Mohammed's death in 2008, its members have identified as the "Community of Imam Warith Deen Mohammed" or simply "Muslim Americans", and its national activities have been largely organized by The Mosque Cares, run by one of W.D. Mohammed's sons Wallace D. Mohammed II.

Programs and aim
The aims of the American Society of Muslims were to establish an Islamic community life (New Africa) in America and the promotion of a positive image of Al-Islam in America and the world. Its organized school accreditation, publications and business ventures relate to Islamic communal life in America, including the sale and circulation of Halal food. At the time of Imam W. Deen Mohammed's death, the CPC (Collective Purchasing Conference) was under development.

Publications
The organization's newspaper was Bilalian News (after Bilal ibn Rabah) in 1975. In 1981 it became The Muslim Journal. It is currently edited by Ayesha K. Mustapha. In 2011 due to low readership and the decline of newspapers nationwide due to the internet, the Muslim Journal downsized to a home office with an online presence http://themuslimjournal.com/, The Muslim Journal Editor, Ayesha Mustapha was forced to find a full-time job and work on the paper online.

Education

After his father's death W. Deen Mohammed transformed the Muhammad University of Islam into the Clara Muhammad Schools, or simply Mohammed Schools, replacing the University of Islam founded by his father. The school system is "an association of approximately 75 elementary, secondary, and high schools throughout the United States and the Caribbean Islands." The schools have been described by Zakiyyah Muhammad of the American Educational Research Association as "models of Islamic education that are achieving commendable results".

After 2003
The Mosque Cares president, Wallace Deen Mohammed II, was seeking to take central control over the intellectual properties (his name, picture, quotes, writings etc.) of his father. This matter is currently a part of the probate case between Imam W. D. Mohammed's family.

See also

Nation of Islam
Five-Percent Nation
Latino Muslims

Notes

External links
The Community of Imam W. Deen Mohammed
The Mosque Cares
Muslim Journal
Atlanta Masjid of Al-Islam
Baitcal News
New Africa Radio
WDM Ministry
WDM Publications
A Three Day Journey
Masjid Freehaven
Masjidul Waritheen
Muslim Community Cultural Center of Baltimore
Houston Masjid of Al-Islam
Muhammad Islamic Center of Greater Hartford
Masjid Taleem Muhammad
North East Denver Islamic Center
Masjidul Taqwa
Mohammed Schools of Atlanta
Ummahstream ~ A service by Taqwa Productions

Nation of Islam
Islamic organizations based in the United States